Elandaikudam is a village in the Ariyalur taluk of Ariyalur district, Tamil Nadu, India.

Facilities
Elandaikudam comes under the control of Venganoor police station.

Economy 
Agriculture is the main source of people those who are depending on Elandaikudam. Nearly 25 hectares are active with the help of few big lakes like Oor Yeri, Big Yeri, and Ponnapudaiyan Yeri.

The farmers are purely accessing the co-operative bank to get agriculture loan and other personal loans.

Education 

The village has a higher secondary school, co-operative bank. Students are daily travelling to Trichy, Ariyalur and Tanjore for earning the basic degrees.

Adjacent communities

References 

Villages in Ariyalur district